Humagne may refer to two wine grape varieties from the Valais region of Switzerland:

 Humagne Blanche ("white humagne"), white grape
 Humagne Rouge ("red humagne"), red grape aka Cornalin d'Aoste